Várzea do Poço is a municipality in the state of Bahia in the North-East region of Brazil. Its population was 9,210 (2020) and its area is 206.5 km².

See also
List of municipalities in Bahia

References

Municipalities in Bahia